The Juruena River is a  long river in west-central Brazil, in the state of Mato Grosso.

Course
The Juruena originates in the Parecis plateau.
Within Mato Grosso the river defines the eastern boundary of the  Igarapés do Juruena State Park, created in 2002.
For the last  of its lower part the river becomes the border between the states Mato Grosso and Amazonas.
In this section the river forms the boundary between the Sucunduri State Park to the west in Amazonas and the Juruena National Park to the east in Mato Grosso.
In the north of this section it forms the boundary between the Bararati Sustainable Development Reserve in Amazonas and the Apiacás Ecological Reserve in Mato Grosso.

The Juruena finally joins the Teles Pires river to form the Tapajós river, which is one of the biggest tributaries to the Amazon River. The Juruena River is not fully navigable due to its many waterfalls and rapids.
The river is known for the Salto Augusto Falls.

References

Sources

External links
Juruena in the Encyclopædia Britannica
Website of WWF about the national park Juruena

Rivers of Mato Grosso
Rivers of Amazonas (Brazilian state)